Shanghai Morning Post (Chinese: 新闻晨报; Pinyin: Xīnwén Chénbào) is a newspaper published by Jiefang Daily Newspaper Group since January 1, 1999.

The daily circulation of this tabloid newspaper is around 500,000 copies per day.

The name Shanghai Morning Post was also used for an older newspaper which circulated in the first half of the twentieth century at the time of the Shanghai International Settlement.

External links 
Website Shanghai Morning Post

References 

Newspapers published in Shanghai
Chinese-language newspapers (Simplified Chinese)
Publications established in 1999